The Persée was a  submarine in the navies of the French Third Republic and Vichy France. Belonging to the M6 series, it was launched in 1931. The vessel was damaged by an explosion while undergoing sea trials off the coast of France, killing two aboard and wounding several others. Based at Brest at the onset of the Second World War, Persée joined in the search for the German merchant fleet still at sea. The vessel joined the Vichy France Navy and transferred first to Casablanca then Dakar.  Persée was attacked at Dakar where the submarine was torpedoed on the surface by a British ship. The vessel was set afire and sank, with the entirety of the crew rescued save one.

Description
Their displacement was 1,572 tonnes on the surface and 2,082 tonnes submerged.

History

Early career
Laid down on 14 April 1929 with the hull number Q154, the submarine was launched on 23 May 1931. Commissioning under the command of lieutenant de vaisseau Bertrand, the Persée left for trials off pointe de Jardeheu, a few miles to the west of Cherbourg. The crankcases of the Schneider diesel motors leaked oil and then exploded, killing two men and wounding several others, including the vessel's second in command, lieutenant de vaisseau Jean L'Herminier, future commander of the  during the Second World War. The submarine was towed back to Cherbourg by the Simon-Duhamel II, a trawler operating from Fecamp, escorted by the submarine , whose doctor treated the wounded. The Persée then entered service on 10 June 1934.

Second World War
At the start of the Second World War she,  and  formed the 6th submarine division, based at Brest. Persée and Poncelet patrolled off the Azores, whence part of the German merchant fleet had fled and from which they were suspected to be acting as supply ships for German U-boats. The pair of submarines returned to Cherbourg on 12 October.

During the German advance in spring the next year she left Cherbourg for Brest, departing the latter at 18:30 on 18 June in tandem with the supply ship Jules Verne, Ajax, Poncelet, Casabianca,  and nine other submarines, arriving at Casablanca on 23 June. After the British attack on Mers-el-Kébir on 3 July, she and Ajax patrolled along the Moroccan coast.

From 19 July onwards Poncelet and Persée were instead based at Dakar. From 26 to 29 August Persée escorted the cable-laying ship Alsace, which had been sent to repair the cable between Casablanca and Dakar, which the British had cut off Cap Juby. On 23 September Dakar was attacked by British and Free French forces.  torpedoed the Persée on the surface off Cap Manuel but failed to sink her. However, British destroyers continued to hunt her and - unable to dive due to shoals - she was seriously damaged and set on fire. Her whole crew except one quartermaster was then picked up by the aviso .

Notes

References

Bibliography 

 

Redoutable-class submarines (1928)
1931 ships
Ships built in France
World War II submarines of France
Lost submarines of France
Maritime incidents in September 1940
Submarines sunk by British warships
World War II shipwrecks in the Atlantic Ocean